Cypress Gardens was a botanical garden and theme park near Winter Haven, Florida that operated from 1936 to 2009. As of 2011, the botanical garden portion had been preserved inside the newly formed Legoland Florida.

History
Billed as Florida's first commercial tourist theme park, Cypress Gardens opened on January 2, 1936, as a botanical garden planted by Dick Pope Sr. and his wife Julie. Over the years it became one of the biggest attractions in Florida, known for its water ski shows, gardens, and Southern Belles.

It became known as the "Water Ski Capital of the World" because it was the site of many of the sport's landmark firsts and over 50 world records were broken there. During World War II, soldiers visited and waterskiing was introduced for their entertainment. Numerous movies were filmed at the park, including portions of This is Cinerama, the first feature filmed in the wide-screen format, and a string of Esther Williams films and TV specials in the 1950s and 1960s. In the 1950s the Southern Belles attraction was introduced, in which young women dressed in the crinolines reminiscent of the Antebellum South. During the 1961-1965 American Civil War Centennial young men dressed in Confederate uniforms would be photographed with the Southern Belles. In the early 1960s a custom photography boat named Miss Cover Girl was introduced, and the park became a popular site for the filming of television commercials.

Many celebrities and dignitaries have skied and visited at the park, including Elvis Presley, King Hussein of Jordan and his son and successor, King Abdullah II. It was also the site of a Johnny Carson special.

On April 14, 2014, it was added to the National Register of Historic Places.

Competitions and changes of ownership
Competition for guests increased after Walt Disney World Resort opened nearby in 1971. In the early 1980s, the Popes retired and transferred the park to their son, Dick Pope, Jr.

In 1985 book publisher Harcourt, Brace, Jovanovich purchased the park to build their SeaWorld parks group. Harcourt sold the other businesses to Anheuser-Busch in 1989. Busch continued to operate Cypress Gardens until April 1, 1995, when a group of the park's managers, led by Bill Reynolds, bought the property.

Under President and CEO Reynolds, the park operated until April 13, 2003, when it closed after a prolonged tourism decline following the September 11, 2001, terrorist attacks. 529 people were put out of work with three days' notice.

Cypress Gardens Adventure Park
On February 22, 2004, Adventure Parks Group, owned by Kent Buescher, purchased the property and renamed it Cypress Gardens Adventure Park. The purchase of the amusement park portion of the Cypress Gardens property was part of a larger conservation transaction. In that transaction, the entire  site was purchased from its previous owner, First Gardens, L.C., by The Trust for Public Land, a national conservation organization. TPL then sold a conservation easement over the entire property to the state of Florida, while Polk County purchased the  gardens portion of the property, less the development rights conveyed in the state easement. Adventure Parks Group purchased the balance of the property, also subject to the conservation easement.

Buescher's plan to reopen the park in September 2004 was delayed by damage from hurricanes Charley, Frances, and Jeanne. Cypress Gardens Adventure Park finally opened in November 2004. One of its new attractions, the Triple Hurricane roller coaster, was named for the tumultuous storm season. The adjacent Splash Island water park opened in 2005, along with the Galaxy Spin roller coaster.

In September 2006, Adventure Parks Group filed for Chapter 11 bankruptcy protection at the Florida site citing approximately $30 million in damages sustained from the 2004 hurricanes.

Land South Adventures, a subsidiary of Mulberry, Florida-based Land South Holdings, purchased Cypress Gardens at a bankruptcy auction on October 16, 2007, for $16.9 million, leaving Buescher as interim manager until Baker Leisure Group of Orlando, Florida, took over park operations in January 2008.

On Monday, November 10, 2008, Land South Holdings announced the temporary closure of the park, which was shut down November 17 of that year. It reopened on March 28, 2009, with an expanded water park named Splash Island. The animals, however, were gone, and the rides did not operate or had already been removed. Cypress Gardens and Splash Island began separate ticketing, with dual-park season passes also available; parking was free.

On September 23, 2009, owner Land South Holdings LLC announced that the park was closing immediately, saying that all avenues to keep the park open had been explored but that they were unable to find a way to "keep the park running in its traditional form".

Legoland acquisition

On January 15, 2010, the world's second largest theme park and attraction operator Merlin Entertainments bought Cypress Gardens with intent to use the site for the fifth Legoland. On January 21, 2010, Merlin Entertainments announced that the park would be turned into Legoland Florida. On October 21, 2010, an October 2011 opening date was announced. Opening day occurred on October 15, 2011, at 10 am EDT.

Attractions

Roller coasters

Thrill rides

Gallery

See also

 Easy to Love (1953 film)
List of botanical gardens in the United States
Water park

References

Further reading

External links
Cypress Gardens Photo Gallery
Cypress Gardens Water Ski Team 

1936 establishments in Florida
2009 disestablishments in Florida
Defunct amusement parks in Florida
Gardens in Florida
History of Polk County, Florida
National Register of Historic Places in Polk County, Florida
Parks in Polk County, Florida
Buildings and structures in Winter Haven, Florida
Amusement parks opened in 1936
Amusement parks closed in 2009